Taivas tiellä is a 2000 Finnish film by Johanna Vuoksenmaa who wrote the screenplay and directed. The film is also known as True Love Waits (International English title).

Plot summary 

For the past years, 62-year-old Helmi has been taking care of her demanding mother. When her mother dies, she is suddenly able to do a lot of things she has not been able to do for a very long time and she is courted by the much younger leader of her church choir.

Cast 
Marja Packalén as Helmi
Peter Franzén as Markku
Kari Väänänen as Alma / Pappi
Tuula Nyman as Alma (Ääni) (voice)
Riitta Elstelä as Saimi
Åke Lindman as Niilo
Pertti Sveholm as Puiston Pentti
Jani Karvinen as Gallup-Poika
Tauno Satomaa as Immanuel-Kanttori
Ossi Lehtinen as Pihan Poika
Maria Järvenhelmi as Katri
Anni Koskinen as Katrin tytär (Katri's Daughter)
Ossi Koskinen as Katrin Poika (Katri's Son)
Merja Pietilä as Myyjä (Salesgirl)
Heli Sirviö as Myyjä (Salesgirl)
Helena Rängman as Minna
Johannes Lahtela as Seksikaupan Myyjä (Salesman at Sex Shop)
Eeva-Riitta Heikkinen as Morsian (Bride)
Eero Järvinen as Sulhanen (Groom)
Pirjo-Riitta Forström as Morsiamen äiti (Mother of the Bride)

Awards 
The film won the Audience award at the 2000 Uppsala International Short Film Festival.

External links 

2000 films
2000 short films
2000s Finnish-language films
2000 romantic drama films
Finnish romantic drama films
Films directed by Johanna Vuoksenmaa
Finnish short films